Campo Grande (Big Field in Portuguese and Spanish) is the capital city of the state of Mato Grosso do Sul, Brazil.

Campo Grande may also refer to:

Places

Argentina
 Campo Grande, Misiones
 Campo Grande, Río Negro

Brazil
 Campo Grande, Alagoas
 Campo Grande, Rio Grande do Norte
 Campo Grande, Rio de Janeiro, a neighborhood
 Campo Grande (district of São Paulo)
 Campo Grande (square), in Salvador
 Campo Grande Air Force Base, in Campo Grande, Mato Grosso do Sul
 Campo Grande International Airport, in Campo Grande, Mato Grosso do Sul

Other countries
 Campo Grande (Lisbon), a parish in Lisbon, Portugal
 Campo Grande (Valladolid), a park in Valladolid, Spain

Other uses
 Campo Grande (film), a 2015 Brazilian-French film
 Campo Grande (Lisbon Metro), a railway station in Lisbon, Portugal
 Campo Grande Atlético Clube, a Brazilian football club